German Creek is a rural locality in south-eastern South Australia, situated in the District Council of Grant. The boundaries were formalised in October 1995 for the long established name. The postcode was originally 5280, but was altered to 5291 in 2004. It was reportedly named for a German who was shepherding in the area.

History
The German Creek area was offered to the government for closer settlement purposes in 1911; however, while the government purchased the nearby Moorak estate, it declined to purchase land at German Creek, and the area was privately subdivided.

It was renamed Benara Creek in 1918, one of many German-themed named places in South Australia to be renamed during World War I; however, it reverted to its original name in 1986. It still to this day still remains "German Creek"

Geography and Climate
German Creek is located within the federal division of Barker, the state electoral district of Mount Gambier and the local government area of the District Council of Grant.
The principal land use at German Creek is primary production.

The Coola Shearing Shed has been listed as a state heritage place on the South Australian Heritage Register.

German Creek has a Warm-Summer Mediterranean climate abbreviated csb on the Köppen-Scale.

Demographics
The 2016 Australian census which was conducted in August 2016 reports that German Creek had a population of 44 people.

References

Towns in South Australia
Limestone Coast